Legend of the Three Caballeros is an animated television series based on the 1944 animated Disney film The Three Caballeros and features the characters Donald Duck, José Carioca and Panchito Pistoles.

It was first released in 2018 in the Philippines following the success of DuckTales. In the United States, it was released on Disney+ when it launched on November 12, 2019, and later aired on Disney XD from August 7 to October 30, 2021.

Premise
When Donald Duck inherits a cabana from his great-grandfather Clinton Coot in the New Quackmore Institute alongside Brazilian parrot José Carioca and Mexican rooster Panchito Gonzalez, they discover a magical book that when opened releases a goddess named Xandra. The goddess explains that Donald, José, and Panchito are the descendants of a trio of adventurers known as The Three Caballeros, who long ago traveled to stop the evil sorcerer Lord Felldrake from taking over the world and ultimately sealed him in a magical staff.

Meanwhile, the staff containing Felldrake is discovered by his descendant Baron Von Sheldgoose, the corrupt President of the New Quackmore Institute. As Sheldgoose sets out to revive Felldrake, the new Three Caballeros must learn to become heroes to save the world from disaster.

Voice cast
The show's main voice cast includes:
Tony Anselmo as Donald Duck
Eric Bauza as José Carioca and Scrooge McDuck
Jaime Camil as Panchito Gonzalez
Grey Griffin as Xandra, the Goddess of Adventure and José's love interest
Tress MacNeille as Daisy Duck
Jessica DiCicco as April, May, and June, Daisy's triplet nieces
Dee Bradley Baker as Ari the Aracuan Bird and Leopold the Horrible
Wayne Knight as Baron Von Sheldgoose
Kevin Michael Richardson as Lord Felldrake Sheldgoose
Jim Cummings as the Bear Rug
David Kaye as Dapper Duck.

Episodes

Release
The series was first released on the DisneyLife app in the Philippines on June 9, 2018, and premiered on Disney Channel in Southeast Asia on January 1, 2019.

In the United States, the series was released as part of Disney+'s launch on November 12, 2019. The series made its U.S. television premiere on August 7, 2021 on Disney XD.

References

External links

2010s American animated television series
2019 American television series debuts
2019 American television series endings
2010s Canadian animated television series
2019 Canadian television series debuts
2019 Canadian television series endings
American children's animated action television series
American children's animated adventure television series
American children's animated comedy television series
American children's animated fantasy television series
Canadian children's animated action television series
Canadian children's animated adventure television series
Canadian children's animated comedy television series
Canadian children's animated fantasy television series
Disney animated television series
Donald Duck television series
Television series by Disney
Television series based on Disney films
English-language television shows
Disney Channels Worldwide original programming